Dart River may refer to any of several rivers:

In Australia
Dart River (Victoria)

In New Zealand
Dart River / Te Awa Whakatipu in the Otago region of the southwestern South Island
Dart River (Tasman) in the northwestern South Island

In the United Kingdom
River Dart, a river in Devon, England
East Dart River, Devon
Little Dart River, Devon
West Dart River, Devon